Aleph (also known as DOT or 2,5-dimethoxy-4-methylthioamphetamine) is a psychedelic hallucinogenic drug and a substituted amphetamine of the phenethylamine class of compounds, which can be used as an entheogen.  It was first synthesized by Alexander Shulgin, who named it after the first letter of the Hebrew alphabet. In his book PiHKAL, Shulgin lists the dosage range as 5–10 mg, with effects typically lasting for 6 to 8 hours.

Like many other psychedelics, aleph is a partial agonist at the 5-HT2A receptor (EC50 = 10 nM). It has weak MAO-A inhibitory activity with an IC50 of 5.2 μM. For reference, amphetamine has an IC50 of 11 μM and 4-methylthioamphetamine has a value of 0.2 μM. A lower number indicates stronger inhibition.

Homologues

Aleph-2

Dosage: 7–12 mg

Duration: 8–16 hours

Effects: Strong visuals

2C analog: 2C-T-2

CAS number: 185562-00-9

SMILES: C1(=C(C=C(C(=C1)SCC)OC)CC(C)N)OC

Aleph-4

Dosage: 7–12 mg

Duration: 12–20 hours

Effects: "profound and deep learning experiences" - Alexander Shulgin

2C analog: 2C-T-4

CAS number: 123643-26-5

SMILES: C1(=C(C=C(C(=C1)SC(C)C)OC)CC(C)N)OC

Aleph-6

Dosage: 40 mg or more

Duration: very long, unspecified

Effects: enhances other psychoactive drugs, similar to 2C-D

2C analog: 2C-T-6 (has never been synthesized)

CAS number: 952006-44-9

SMILES: C1(=C(C=C(C(=C1)SC2=CC=CC=C2)OC)CC(C)N)OC

Aleph-7

Dosage: 4–7 mg

Duration: 15–30 hours

2C analog: 2C-T-7

CAS number: 207740-16-7

SMILES: C1(=C(C=C(C(=C1)SCCC)OC)CC(C)N)OC

Legality 
In the United States Aleph is a Schedule 1 controlled substance as a positional isomer of 2C-T-4 and 2C-T-7

See also 
 2,5-Dimethoxy-4-substituted amphetamines

References

External links 
 Aleph Entry in PiHKAL
 Aleph-2 Entry in PiHKAL
 Aleph-4 Entry in PiHKAL
 Aleph-6 Entry in PiHKAL
 Aleph-7 Entry in PiHKAL

Thioethers
Substituted amphetamines
Designer drugs
2,5-Dimethoxyphenethylamines